Kate Slattery Parghi (born February 2, 1986) is a former ice dancer who competed internationally for the United States. She competed with Chuen-Gun Lee, a 2002 Olympic skater from South Korea. The two skated together from 2003 to 2007 placing 7th at the 2005 National Figure Skating Championships, 7th at 2004 Bofrost Cup on Ice, and 7th at the 2006 Nebelhorn Trophy. They were coached by Gennady Karponosov, Natalia Linichuk, and Vitaly Popkov. The youngest of five children, Kate also played women's ice hockey for her high school team, as well as being a competitor in ladies singles. They announced their split in March 2007. In fall 2012, Kate married American Business man, Doc Parghi.

References

Living people
American female ice dancers
American female single skaters
1986 births
21st-century American women